Yasmin Tredell (born 18 November 1992) is a British rower who competed in international events in the women's eights in both senior and junior levels.

References

1992 births
Living people
Sportspeople from Worcester, England
English female rowers
European Rowing Championships medalists